Gasman may refer to:

 One who works for a gas company, reading gas meters
 Gasman (surname)
 Gasman, a character in the Maximum Ride book series
 Gasman (film), a 1997 short film directed by Lynne Ramsay
 Gasman, Iran
 The Gasman, a 1941 German comedy film

See also 
 Milkman
 Dustman
 Postman